Isabel Janet Macneill, OC, OBE (4 June 1908 – 18 August 1990) was a Canadian Women's Royal Canadian Naval Service officer and public servant.

Appointed commander of the stone frigate HMCS Conestoga in 1943, Macneill was the first Canadian woman to command a naval establishment.

After the Second World War, she became a prison superintendent.

References 

1908 births
1990 deaths
Officers of the Order of Canada
Canadian Officers of the Order of the British Empire
Royal Canadian Navy officers
Royal Canadian Navy personnel of World War II
Canadian prison officials